The name Ogilvy may refer to:

Ogilvy (name)
Clan Ogilvy
Ogilvy (department store), in Montreal, Canada
Ogilvy (agency), an advertising agency, formerly known as Ogilvy & Mather
Ogilvy Renault, Canadian law firm
Ogilvy's, defunct department store in Ottawa, Canada

See also
Ogilvie (name)
Ogilvie (disambiguation)